BBC Radio Orkney is a community radio station, a local opt-out of BBC Radio Scotland, for the Orkney Islands, which is based in Castle Street, Kirkwall, Orkney, in Scotland.

Depending on the time of year, there are either two or three broadcasts per day on weekdays on the BBC Radio Scotland frequency: the flagship breakfast programme Around Orkney, a short lunchtime news at 12:54pm featuring local news and weather for Orkney and Shetland, and Radio Orkney's Evening Programme.

From January–March, an evening schedule with weekday programmes air from 6pm-7pm.

The station can be heard on 93.7FM, online via their website, BBC Sounds and via smart speakers.

Programming

Around Orkney
Around Orkney is a news programme broadcast weekday mornings from 7:30 to 8:00am (opting out from BBC Radio Scotland's Good Morning Scotland), featuring local news, weather, travel, sport, daily diary, job opportunities and mart reports. Every Wednesday there is a "Postbag" section featuring letters sent in by listeners. Radio Orkney produced their first-ever outside broadcasts in summer 2007, from the County Show and the Parish Cup Final.

Radio Orkney's Evening Programme
Radio Orkney's Evening Programme (often referred to as just the evening programme) is a programme broadcast from 6:10 to 7:00pm from Monday–Thursday between the months of October and May. There are various programmes on the evening schedule, including the regular Monday night Bruck programme (swaps and appeals), a folk music programme (Tuesday Folk)), a country music programme (On The Border), Whassigo (described as "an Orcadian Call My Bluff"), Classic Concert (archive local recordings) and the annual Ba Quiz.

Friday Requests
Friday Requests is broadcast on Friday evenings throughout the year. The programme is identical in structure to the Radio Orkney programme except that it plays music which residents of Orkney have requested through the week via phoning a request line, usually dedicated their requests.

History
Celtic rock band Wolfstone wrote a signature tune for BBC Radio Orkney. However, it was ultimately unused and appeared on their second album The Chase (1992) as its first track, "Tinnie Run".

See also
BBC Radio Shetland

References

External links

BBC Radio Orkney on Instagram 
nstagram

1977 establishments in Scotland
BBC regional radio stations
BBC Scotland
Kirkwall
Radio stations in Scotland
Radio stations established in 1977